Anatoli Andreyevich Anisimov (born 23 May 1998) is a Russian football player.

Career

Club
Anisimov made his debut for the main PFC CSKA Moscow squad on 10 October 2018 in a Russian Cup game against FC Tyumen. On 31 May 2019, Anisimov left CSKA Moscow after the expiration of his contract.

International
Anisimov represented Russia U17 at the 2015 FIFA U-17 World Cup.

Career statistics

Club

References

External links
 

1998 births
Sportspeople from Tatarstan
Living people
Russian footballers
Russia youth international footballers
Association football midfielders
PFC CSKA Moscow players
FC Ural Yekaterinburg players
FC Veles Moscow players
FC Tyumen players
Russian First League players
Russian Second League players